The 2008 Pub Charity Sevens tournament was held in Queenstown, New Zealand between 13 and 14 January 2008. It was the fifth New Zealand National Rugby Sevens Tournament to be held in Queenstown. Auckland were the defending champions, having previously won the tournament three consecutive times.

Pool stages

Pool A
{| class="wikitable" style="text-align: center;"
|-
!width="200"|Team
!width="40"|Pld
!width="40"|W
!width="40"|D
!width="40"|L
!width="40"|PF
!width="40"|PA
!width="40"|Pts
|- style="background:#ccffcc;"
|align=left|  Auckland
|3||3||0||0||88||27||9
|- style="background:#ccffcc;"
|align=left|  Otago
|3||2||0||1||69||21||7
|-
|align=left|  Waikato
|3||1||0||2||57||65||5
|-
|align=left|  Horowhenua-Kapiti
|3||0||0||3||17||118||3
|}

Pool B
{| class="wikitable" style="text-align: center;"
|-
!width="200"|Team
!width="40"|Pld
!width="40"|W
!width="40"|D
!width="40"|L
!width="40"|PF
!width="40"|PA
!width="40"|Pts
|- style="background:#ccffcc;"
|align=left|  Canterbury
|3||3||0||0||89||15||9
|- style="background:#ccffcc;"
|align=left|  North Harbour
|3||2||0||1||74||54||7
|-
|align=left|  Wellington
|3||1||0||2||74||65||5
|-
|align=left|  West Coast
|3||0||0||3||12||115||3
|}

Pool C
{| class="wikitable" style="text-align: center;"
|-
!width="200"|Team
!width="40"|Pld
!width="40"|W
!width="40"|D
!width="40"|L
!width="40"|PF
!width="40"|PA
!width="40"|Pts
|- style="background:#ccffcc;"
|align=left|  Bay of Plenty
|3||3||0||0||91||57||7
|- style="background:#ccffcc;"
|align=left|  Taranaki
|3||2||0||1||61||53||7
|-
|align=left|  Hawke's Bay
|3||1||0||2||50||52||5
|-
|align=left|  Tasman
|3||0||0||3||43||83||3
|}

Pool D
{| class="wikitable" style="text-align: center;"
|-
!width="200"|Team
!width="40"|Pld
!width="40"|W
!width="40"|D
!width="40"|L
!width="40"|PF
!width="40"|PA
!width="40"|Pts
|- style="background:#ccffcc;"
|align=left|  Manawatu
|3||3||0||0||64||46||9
|- style="background:#ccffcc;"
|align=left|  Counties Manukau
|3||2||0||1||76||26||7
|-
|align=left|  Northland
|3||1||0||2||38||59||5
|-
|align=left|  Southland
|3||0||0||3||41||88||3
|}

Knockout

Shield

Bowl

Plate

Cup

External links
 Official Site

Pub Charity Sevens
New Zealand National Rugby Sevens Tournament
2008 rugby sevens competitions